Chi Tu (other alternative spellings include Chihtu, Chitu or Ch-ih-t'u; Sanskrit: Raktamaritika or Raktamrittika; ; Malay language: Tanah Merah) was an ancient kingdom mentioned in the history of China. The Sui dynasty annals describe an advanced kingdom called Chi Tu in 607, when Chang Chun was sent as an ambassador there. The location of Chi Tu was disputed; proposals for its location include areas in the states of Kelantan or Pahang in Malaysia, or in Songkhla and Pattani Province of southern Thailand. The best evidence to support the Kelantan theory was when the envoys left Chi Tu, the sail took 10 days to reach Champa, this indicates the kingdom was located somewhere 'red earth' around the main river of Kelantan. The inscribed Buddhagupta Stone found in Kedah mentioned a Raktamrttika, meaning "red earth land".

History

The Chi Tu kingdom is believed to have existed as early as 100 BC to the 6th century AD. The royal family's name was Chu-dan (which means Gautama Buddha) and the king was Li-fo-duo-se. According to Chinese records, Chi Tu was built by kit mow (Mon-Khmer) peoples who sailed from the coast of Funan (southern Indochina) that eventually intermarried with the local population. "... Chi Tu is a derivation nation of Funan, located in within the southern sea, sailing hundred days to reach, the majority terrain was red, thus named Red Earth Kingdom (Chi means red, Tu means earth). East bordering Po-Lo-La, West bordering Po-Lo-So, South bordering Ho Lo Tan, thousands of square miles in land area. The king has three wives and the kingdom embraced Buddhism ...".

Chi Tu kingdom along with Langkasuka, Kedah and others were early important trade centers (approximately 100 BC to 700 AD). During this period, ships coming from China and Funan (from Indian Ocean as well) stop at the coast of Malay Peninsula. They get the local porters to transport the goods, using rafts, elephants and manpower along the Early transpeninsular routeway and part of the ancient Spice Route (Sea Route). By the 800 AD, the Chi Tu kingdom went into decline.

Location
Scholars do not agree on the location of Raktamaritika. While some consider it in the area of Phatthalung / Songkhla area, or Kelantan. The ruins around the Songkhla lake such as Bang Kaeo in Phatthalung or Sathing Phra in Songkhla then might be one of the cities of Raktamaritika.

Sources from Indian scholars
J.L. Meons (1937) believed that early Srivijaya was located in Kelantan and K.A. Nilakanta Sastri (1949) supported the idea. The Kelantan theory may not be far-fetched, since the Chinese Sui dynasty annals of the 7th century describe an advanced kingdom called Chi Tu or Raktamrittika (as in Kelantanese history) as being in Kelantan, which the name was later changed to "Sri Wijaya Mala". The founding of Sri Wijaya Mala was 667 BC with its capital called "Valai", and it was situated along the upper Kelantan river of Pergau, known for its rich gold mines. It was until 570 BC that the kingdom changed its name to Sri Wijaya.

Songkhla vicinity theory
The inscription of the Buddhagupta Stone found in Kedah mentioned a Raktamaritika, the meaning is red earth land, to be the home town of a seafarer named Buddhagupta.

The old name of Songkhla is Singgora (City of Lions), which coincides with the fact that according to the Chinese chronicles the capital of Chitu was Sing-Ha (means lion) and also the nearby Singhanakhon district.

This name may also be related to Tambralinga because there is "Tam" (means red) in this name as same as Raktamaritika and Tampapanni. And this state has appeared in 642, the same area of the central Malay peninsula after Chitu has already faded away from the history. The best evidence supporting this theory is the mention that when the envoys left Chitu, the sailing took 10 days to reach Champa, which indicates the kingdom was located at the 'red earth' areas such as Rattaphum because Rattaphum means red earth as well.

See also
 Early History of Kedah
 Mahanavika Buddhagupta
 Pan Pan
 Nakhon Si Thammarat kingdom (Ligor)
 Kelantan
 Sultanate of Kedah

References

Further reading

External links

 https://web.archive.org/web/20040810090708/http://mis-pattani.pn.psu.ac.th/registra/grade/temp/speech/panel16fullpaper/EvanescentKingdom1panel%2016.html
 Chinese Sui dynasty annals
 India's Cultural Relations with South-East Asia
 赤土国
 

Indianized kingdoms
Former countries in Malaysian history
History of Malaysia
Former countries in Thai history
Ancient Thailand
7th-century disestablishments in Thailand
Historical Chinese exonyms